Dave Boat is an American voice actor active in animation, films and video games.

Filmography

Film

Television

Video games

References

External links
 Official website
 

Living people
American male voice actors
American male video game actors
American male film actors
American male television actors
20th-century American male actors
21st-century American male actors
Year of birth missing (living people)
Place of birth missing (living people)